Lorne Albert Calvert  (born December 24, 1952) was the 13th premier of Saskatchewan, from 2001 to 2007. Calvert served as leader of the Saskatchewan New Democratic Party from 2001 to June 6, 2009, when he was succeeded by Dwain Lingenfelter.

Early life and career
Calvert was born in Moose Jaw, Saskatchewan. In 1975, Calvert married Betty Sluzalo of Perdue, Saskatchewan. He received his undergraduate degree in economics at the University of Regina. He originally was going to study law, but felt the calling to the ministry of the United Church of Canada. After attending the then-Regina Campus and the St. Andrew's College seminary in Saskatoon, he was ordained as minister of the United Church of Canada in 1976 and served as minister of several rural congregations. From 1979 to 1986, Calvert was the minister of the substantial pastoral charge of Zion United Church in Moose Jaw.

Entry into provincial politics
He entered provincial politics in the 1986 provincial election, running as a New Democrat on a platform of prohibiting the construction of a proposed casino in Moose Jaw. He was elected to the Legislative Assembly of Saskatchewan as the Member of the Legislative Assembly (MLA) for the constituency of Moose Jaw South.

He was re-elected in the 1991 and 1995 elections in the riding of Moose Jaw Wakamow. He did not run in the 1999 election, and was succeeded by Deb Higgins.

Following the resignation of NDP leader and Premier Roy Romanow, Calvert won the NDP leadership, and became premier on February 8, 2001. He was re-elected to the legislature in a by-election in Romanow's riding of Saskatoon Riversdale.

Premier of Saskatchewan
Calvert and the NDP narrowly defeated the centre-right opposition Saskatchewan Party in the 2003 provincial election. The NDP won 30 seats of the 58 seats in the election. During the campaign, Calvert apologized for an internal cartoon that had been leaked to the media. It depicted Saskatchewan Party leader Elwin Hermanson loading NDP sympathizers onto rail cars. The cartoon referred to speculation that, if elected, Hermanson would replace civil servants who were NDP supporters with Saskatchewan Party supporters. B'nai Brith Canada stated that the cartoon "trivializes the crimes of the Holocaust and causes undeserved anguish to those who survived that evil regime".

Calvert had a cameo appearance (as himself) in "Ruby Newsday", an episode of Corner Gas, a comedy series set in Saskatchewan.

Calvert was also engaged in a war of words with federal Conservative MP Maurice Vellacott over how the clawback of non-renewable resource revenues from the equalization formula as implemented in the 2007 federal budget. Calvert argued that the province would get less under the new federal formula.

Calvert and his government were defeated in the 2007 provincial election, dropping to 20 seats while the Saskatchewan Party under Brad Wall won a majority government with 38.

Federal New Democratic Party spokesman Brad Lavigne later told reporters that the party had asked Calvert to consider standing as a candidate in the 2008 federal election. Calvert declined the offer, although he stated that he would work hard to assist the party's federal candidates.

Retirement from politics
Calvert announced his retirement as party leader on October 16, 2008. Dwain Lingenfelter was chosen to be his successor on June 6, 2009.

From 2009 to 2018, Calvert was the principal at St. Andrew's College in Saskatoon.

He is a member of the Saskatchewan Order of Merit.

References

External links
 

1952 births
Living people
Premiers of Saskatchewan
Saskatchewan New Democratic Party MLAs
Ministers of the United Church of Canada
People from Moose Jaw
Leaders of the Saskatchewan CCF/NDP
Canadian Christian socialists
Members of the Saskatchewan Order of Merit
21st-century Canadian politicians
Members of the Executive Council of Saskatchewan